Jeff Ferguson (born July 23, 1969) is a Canadian former professional ice hockey and roller hockey goaltender.

Early life 
Ferguson was born in Calgary, Alberta. He played major junior hockey in the Western Hockey League with the Calgary Wranglers, Lethbridge Hurricanes, and Spokane Chiefs.

Career 
Ferguson began his professional career during the 1994–1995 season in the Sunshine Hockey League with the Fresno Falcons. He went on the play six seasons with the Falcons before retiring following the 1999–2000 season.

In 1996, Ferguson set a Roller Hockey International (RHI) record when he posted a goals against average of 4.87 over 16 games played with the Los Angeles Blades.

Awards and honours

References

External links

1969 births
Living people
Calgary Wranglers (WHL) players
Canadian ice hockey goaltenders
Fresno Falcons players
Ice hockey people from Calgary
Lethbridge Hurricanes players
Spokane Chiefs players
Calgary Rad'z players
Los Angeles Blades players
San Jose Rhinos players